RedOctane, Inc. was an American electronic entertainment company best known for producing the Guitar Hero series, beginning in November 2005. RedOctane became a wholly owned subsidiary of Activision in 2006. In February 2010, Activision closed the RedOctane division.

History
RedOctane was founded in 1999 by the brothers Kai Huang and Charles Huang. They got their beginnings operating the world's first online video game rental service, called WebGameZone. They soon began to create game accessories such as the Red Octane Ignition dance mat, joysticks, and other accessories to build upon already-existing musical games. After soon realizing that their game accessories were tied to the launch dates of the games they were producing for, Red Octane began producing games. Their first original game was a PlayStation 2 port of Roxor Games' arcade rhythm game In the Groove.

RedOctane teamed with developer Harmonix Music Systems to release Guitar Hero in November 2005 for the PlayStation 2. The game was successful and RedOctane had Jack McCauley design more sophisticated hardware for a sequel, which they released in 2006 for the PlayStation 2 and Xbox 360.

In May 2006, video game publisher Activision announced plans to acquire RedOctane, completing the deal on June 6, 2006. Activision reportedly paid RedOctane $99.9 million in cash and common stock in the acquisition. Activision acquired McCauley's consulting company, R0R3 Devices, at the same time.

After the Activision buy-out and a split from Harmonix, who went on to develop competing game Rock Band, RedOctane utilized Activision owned Neversoft, the team responsible for the Tony Hawk skateboarding video game franchise, to take the helm on Guitar Hero III: Legends of Rock, which became available in November 2007.

Gaming news site Kotaku called Guitar Hero an "instant cult classic". In its 26 first months after release, Guitar Hero generated over $1B in sales.

RedOctane released Guitar Hero World Tour in October 2008.

On February 11, 2010, Activision announced the closure of their RedOctane division.

References 

Defunct Activision subsidiaries
Former Vivendi subsidiaries
Dance pads
Defunct video game companies of the United States
Video game companies established in 1999
Video game companies disestablished in 2010
Defunct companies based in the San Francisco Bay Area
American companies established in 1999